Neama Riadh Ahmed (Arabic: نعمة رياض; born 1989) is an Iraqi television presenter for Dijlah TV channel. She has presented morning, social and artistic TV programs.

Early life 
 Neama Riadh Ahmed was born in Iraq in 1989, her father was the singer Riadh Ahmed and her sister Rahma Riadh Ahmed, Star Academy star, she spent her childhood between Oman and Bahrain, and during that period she presented a number of children's programs.

Career 
Neama Riadh Ahmed presented a number of morning, social and artistic TV programs through numerous channels, one of these TV programs is “No longer a secret”, a social program that was broadcast on Dijlah satellite channel, and aimed to shed light on the oppressed cases in Iraqi society in health, educational and legal sectors. She also presented radio broadcasts, "Shuko Mako", which was broadcast in more than one Arabic country, such as Jordan and Iraq, through "Hawa Dijla" station. In 2019, Neama joined the Sout Al-Khaleej radio channel to participate in presentation of two morning radio programs, Taghareed “Tweets” and Amer Tedallal “commands are pampered”.

Works 
 No longer a secret on Dijlah 
 Hawa Alfan on Dijlah 
 Aghani Khalidah on MTV Iraq 
 Musicana on Al Sharqiya 
 Taghareed on Sout Al-Khaleej  
 Amer Tedallal on Sout Al-Khaleej

References

External links 
Neama Riadh on Instagram

Neama Riadh on Twitter

Neama Riadh on Facebook

Iraqi television presenters
Iraqi women television presenters
1989 births
Living people